Pousse is a surname. Notable people with the surname include:

 André Pousse (1919–2005), French actor
 Pierre Pousse (born 1966), French ice hockey player